Campo das Salésias, also known as Estádio José Manuel Soares, was a multi-use stadium in Lisbon, Portugal. It was initially used as the stadium of C.F. Os Belenenses matches.  It was replaced by the current Estádio do Restelo in 1956.  The capacity of the stadium was 25,000 spectators.  It was named after José Manuel Soares, who played for Belenenses. It was the first turf field in Portugal and one of the firsts having artificial lighting.
Nowadays, Belenenses are rebuilding the stadium to turn it into a field to the youngest players of club.

External links
 Stadium information

Salesias
C.F. Os Belenenses
Sports venues completed in 1928